is a railway station on the Minobu Line of Central Japan Railway Company (JR Central) located in the city of Fujinomiya, Shizuoka Prefecture, Japan. It is approximately at the mid-way point of the Minobu Line within Shizuoka Prefecture.

Lines
Fujinomiya Station is served by the Minobu Line and is located 10.7 kilometers from the southern terminus of the line at Fuji Station.

Layout
Fujinomiya Station consists of a single side platform serving Track 1, which is an auxiliary platform used primarily for chartered trains by the Soka Gakkai organization, and a single island platform for Track 2 and Track 3, which handle regularly scheduled services.  The station building is elevated above the platforms. The station is staffed.

Platforms

Adjacent stations

History
It came under control of the Japan National Railway on May 1, 1941 and on October 1, 1942 its name was changed to the present name. The station building was rebuilt in 1983. Along with the division and privatization of JNR on April 1, 1987, the station came under the control and operation of the Central Japan Railway Company. The station was remodeled in 2007 to allow for barrier free access.

Station numbering was introduced to the Minobu Line in March 2018; Fujinomiya Station was assigned station number CC06.

Passenger statistics
In fiscal 2015, the station was used by an average of 2,401 passengers daily (boarding passengers only).

Surrounding area
 Fujinomiya City Hall
 Fujisan Hongū Sengen Taisha

See also
 List of railway stations in Japan

References

External links

 JR Central information
 Stations of the Minobu Line 

Railway stations in Shizuoka Prefecture
Railway stations in Japan opened in 1913
Minobu Line
Fujinomiya, Shizuoka